The Concierto Andaluz (Spanish: Andalusian concerto) is a concerto for four guitars and orchestra by Spanish composer Joaquín Rodrigo. First played in San Antonio, Texas, USA on 18 November 1967.

Movements
 Tiempo de Bolero
 Adagio
 Allegretto

See also
 Concierto de Aranjuez
 Fantasia para un Gentilhombre
 Joaquin Rodrigo
 Spanish guitar

References
 Fundación Victoria y Joaquín Rodrigo

Concertos by Joaquín Rodrigo
1967 compositions
Rodrigo
Guitar concertos
Compositions in A major